Tallinn Observatory is an observatory in Tallinn, Estonia. Since 1993, the observatory is a part of Tallinn University of Technology.

The observatory was established in 1954. Before using as an observatory, the building was Glehn's lookout tower (see Glehn Castle).

Directors
 1954-1962 Charles Villmann
 1962-2002 Peep Kalv
 2000- Voldemar Harvig

See also
 List of astronomical observatories

References

External links
 

Astronomical observatories in Estonia
Buildings and structures in Tallinn